Agaram Agraharam is a village in the Hosur taluk of Krishnagiri district, Tamil Nadu, India. Located there is Abaya Hastha Swayambu Sri Lakshmi Narasimha Swamy Temple

References 

 

Villages in Krishnagiri district